Angelo Bergamonti (18 March 1939 - 4 April 1971) was an Italian Grand Prix motorcycle road racer.

Bergamonti was born in Gussola.  His best year was in 1970 when he finished third in the 500cc world championship, behind his MV Agusta teammate Giacomo Agostini and Ginger Molloy. Bergamonti was killed in 1971 during a race held on the city streets of Riccione.

References 

1939 births
1971 deaths
Sportspeople from the Province of Cremona
Italian motorcycle racers
125cc World Championship riders
250cc World Championship riders
350cc World Championship riders
500cc World Championship riders
Motorcycle racers who died while racing
Sport deaths in Italy
20th-century Italian people